Sergei Valeryevich Volchkov (Russian: Сергей Валерьевич Волчков, Belarusian: Сяргей Валер'евіч Ваўчкоў, Syarhei Valeryevich Vawchkow; born 3 April 1988 in Bychaŭ, Byelorussian SSR, USSR) is a Russian singer of Belarusian origin.

Biography

2013: Golos 
On 27 December 2013 he won the Russian reality television singing competition Golos, based on The Voice series, with the other finalist Nargiz Zakirova coming as runner-up. In the final round he got 75% of votes.

He works in the "Gradsky Hall".

Personal life 
He currently lives in Moscow, is married and has daughter Ksenia (born 2014). He is Russian Orthodox Christian.

References

1988 births
Living people
People from Bykhaw District
21st-century Belarusian male singers
Russian Orthodox Christians from Russia
Russian people of Belarusian descent
The Voice (franchise) winners
21st-century Russian male singers
21st-century Russian singers